Institute of Management and Computer Studies (IMCOST) is an Indian business school, in Thane, Maharashtra.

Parentage
IMCOST is a part of the ASM family. Audyogik Shikshan Mandal (ASM) is an autonomous, non - profit making education body. The trust was set up in 1983.

Some of the other educational institutes under Audyogik Shikshan Mandal (ASM) are:

Institute of Business Management and Research (IBMR - Pune)
Institute of International Business and Research (IIBR - Pune)
Institute of Professional Studies (IPS - Pimpri, Pune)
Institute of Computer Studies (ICS - Pimpri, Pune)
College of Commerce, Science and IT (CSIT - Chinchwad, Pune)
Geetamata English Medium School (GEMS - Pune)

Academic Programmes
All programs are approved by AICTE and conducted under Mumbai University.
Masters in Management Studies (MMS), a two-year full-time course in management studies
Masters in Computer Applications (MCA), a three-year full-time course in computer applications
Masters in Financial Management (MFM), a three-year part-time course in management studies with finance specialization
Masters in Human Resource Development Management (MHRDM), a three-year part-time course in management studies with human resource specialization
Masters in Marketing Management (MMM), a three-year part-time course in management studies with marketing specialization
Bachelor in Management Studies (BMS), a three-year full-time bachelor course in management studies

External links
  Official Website

Business schools in Maharashtra
Education in Thane
Affiliates of the University of Mumbai
Educational institutions established in 2003
2003 establishments in Maharashtra